Messaging applications can refer to:

 Text messaging
 SMS
 Instant messaging
 List of messaging applications for Nintendo game consoles